Deh-e Bar Ahuyi (also Romanized as Deh-e Bar Āhūyī) is a village in Jahanabad Rural District, in the Central District of Hirmand County, Sistan and Baluchestan Province, Iran. At the 2006 census, its population was 147, in 25 families.

References 

Populated places in Hirmand County